John K may refer to:

John Kricfalusi, Canadian animator and voice actor
John K (musician), American singer

See also
John Kay (disambiguation)
John Kaye (disambiguation)